Floris Versteeg (born 22 October 1994) is a Dutch basketball player who last played for Apollo Amsterdam of the Dutch Basketball League (DBL).

College career
Versteeg attended and played for the Canarias Basketball Academy, which he followed by playing one season of college basketball for Cal State Fullerton Titans men's basketball team.

Professional career
On 9 July 2018, Versteeg signed with Dutch Windmills, which made its debut season in the DBL. On 10 April 2019, Windmills withdrew from the DBL due to its financial problems.

He signed with Apollo Amsterdam in August 2019. As the captain of the team, he had his best year yet with 11 points per game in the 2019–20 DBL season.

References

1994 births
Apollo Amsterdam players
Living people
Power forwards (basketball)
B.S. Leiden players
Cal State Fullerton Titans men's basketball players
Basketball players from Amsterdam
Dutch men's basketball players
Dutch Basketball League players
Dutch Windmills players